The River Tweed, or Tweed Water, is a river  long that flows east across the Border region in Scotland and northern England.  Tweed cloth derives its name from its association with the River Tweed. The Tweed is one of the great salmon rivers of Britain and the only river in England where an Environment Agency rod licence is not required for angling. The river generates a large income for the local borders region, attracting anglers from all around the world.

Etymology 
Tweed may represent an Old Brittonic name meaning "border". A doubtful proposal is that the name is derived from a non-Celtic form of the Indo-European root *teuha- meaning "swell, grow powerful".

Course

The River Tweed flows primarily through the scenic Borders region of Scotland. Eastwards from the settlements on opposing banks of Birgham and Carham it forms the historic boundary between Scotland and England.

It rises in the Lowther Hills at Tweed's Well near to where the Clyde, draining northwest ( from the Tweed's Well), and the Annan draining south ( from the Tweed's Well) also rise. "Annan, Tweed and Clyde rise oot the ae hillside" is a saying from the Border region. East of Kelso, it becomes a section of the eastern part of the border. Entering England, its lower reaches are in Northumberland, where it enters the North Sea at Berwick-upon-Tweed.

Catchment 
The river east of St Boswells runs through a drumlin field. It is the relic of a paleo-ice stream that flowed through the area during the last glaciation. Major towns through which the Tweed flows include  Innerleithen, Peebles, Galashiels, Melrose, Kelso, Coldstream and Berwick-upon-Tweed, where it flows into the North Sea. Tweed tributaries include:
Whiteadder Water
Blackadder Water
River Till
Eden Water
Teviot Water
Leader Water
Gala Water
Leithen Water
Quair Water
Eddleston Water
Manor Water
Lyne Water
Holms Water

The upper parts of the catchment of the Tweed in Scotland form the area known as Tweeddale, part of which is protected as the Upper Tweeddale National Scenic Area, one of 40 such areas in Scotland which are defined so as to identify areas of exceptional scenery and to ensure its protection from inappropriate development.

Management
Despite that the catchment straddles the border between Scotland and England, management of it – in terms of water quality, bio-security, and ultimately protection of the salmon of the River Tweed – is overseen by a single body, the River Tweed Commission.

See also
List of places in the Scottish Borders
Tweeddale
Anglo–Scottish border
Union Bridge
Rivers and Fisheries Trusts of Scotland
Rivers of the United Kingdom
Both sides the Tweed

Gallery

Notes

External links

British Waterways: River Tweed
The River Tweed Commission website
The Tweed Foundation
Tweed Forum website
River Tweed: Special Area of Conservation (SAC)
SEPA (Scottish Environment Protection Agency): River Level Data
River Tweed map
Gazetteer for Scotland: River Tweed
Paper describing palaeo-icestream and landforms in the Tweed Valley
Open Canoe Hire Specialists

 
Rivers of Northumberland
Tweed
Anglo-Scottish border
Sites of Special Scientific Interest in Annandale and Eskdale
Sites of Special Scientific Interest in Berwickshire and Roxburgh
Sites of Special Scientific Interest in Mid and East Lothian
Sites of Special Scientific Interest in Tweeddale and Ettrick and Lauderdale